is a Japanese television series that aired on TV Tokyo from January 8 to March 25, 2008.

Plot

A previously all-girls high school begins accepting male students for the first time, but the girls are shocked to see that the boys are all rowdy, unruly, and unfashionable, far from their image of being a "perfect prince." Each girl decides to pair up with a boy and gives him a makeover, while learning more about his background and helping him resolve his personal problems.

Cast
 Kotaro Yanagi as Tatsuya Shinozaki
 Yurie Midori as Nami Yuki
 Hiroki Aiba as Shurinosuke Hata
 Yukihiro Takiguchi as Fumizō Sōma
 Kouhei Takeda as Hayato Noda
 Renn Kiriyama as Kirin Yoshiyuki
 Hatsune Matsushima as Haruka Shinagawa
 Saki Kondo as Chiaki Shibata
 Airi Toriyama as Misaki Koshino
 Sayaka Akimoto as Natsuki Kiryū
 Mayuko Arisue as Fuyuko Sano
 Kouhei Kumai as Ken Oshikaga
 Tomokazu Yoshida as Mamoru Shibukawa
 Shingo Nakagawa as Gaku Hoshino
 Yuuka Rikuna as Tōko Kiriyama
 Aina Nishiaki as Hitomi Andō
 Sae Miyazawa as Koharu Kido
 Kaede as Naomi Suzuki
 Erika Sakai as Yuu Nishiyama
 Hijiri Sakurai as Shun Koseki
 Ryunosuke Kawai as Keita Yamasaki
 Takashi Nagayama as Takashi Nanbara
 Ken Maeda as Shigeo Senkawa
 Jyouji Kuraki as Kaname Mitani

Episodes

References

External links
  

2008 Japanese television series debuts
2008 Japanese television series endings
Japanese comedy television series
Japanese drama television series
TV Tokyo original programming